Filippo Mariotti (Apiro, September 6, 1833 - Rome, June 25, 1911) was an Italian politician and lawyer. He was deputy of the Kingdom of Italy from the 10th Legislature, then Senator of the Kingdom of Italy in the XVIII Legislature and Secretary General of the Ministry of Education.

Member of Parliament from 1867 to 1892, then Senator, Secretary of Education (1887-1891) and State Councilor. The November 15, 1880 asked the House a "survey on libraries."

In 1900, as the representative of the Government, was part of the Commission who attended the exhumation of remains of Giacomo Leopardi in Naples, together with Professor Enrico Cocchia, representing the Royal Academy of Archaeology and Letters of Naples, and Professor Francesco Moroncini, representing Family Leopardi.

Honors 
 Legion of Honour
 Order of the Redeemer

Italian political scientists
Italian politicians
19th-century Italian lawyers
1833 births
1911 deaths